The Women's 50m rifle prone event at the 2010 South American Games was held on March 24 at 12:00.

Individual

Medalists

Results

Final

Team

Medalists

Results

References
Final
Team

50m Rifle Prone W